Steinbok may refer to: 

 Steenbok or steinbok, a small antelope of southern and eastern Africa
 Steinbok Peak, a mountain near Hope, British Columbia, Canada
 Steinbok, the name given to the first LNER Thompson Class B1 steam locomotive

See also
 Steinbock (disambiguation)